Rohan Bopanna and Ramkumar Ramanathan defeated Luke Saville and John-Patrick Smith in the final, 6–7(10–12), 6–3, [10–6] to win the doubles tennis title at the 2022 Tata Open Maharashtra. It was their second title as a team and marked Bopanna's 21st individual career ATP Tour doubles title and Ramanathan's second. Saville and Smith were contesting their first ATP Tour doubles final together. 

André Göransson and Christopher Rungkat were the defending champions from when the tournament was last held in 2020, but neither returned to compete.

Seeds

Draw

Draw

References

External links
Main draw

2022 ATP Tour
2022 Tata Open Maharashtra
2022 Tata Open Maharashtra – 2